The , also referred to as , is one of the seven constituent companies of Japan Railways Group (JR Group). It operates intercity rail services within Kyushu, Japan and the JR Kyushu Jet Ferry Beetle hydrofoil service across the Tsushima Strait between Fukuoka and Busan, South Korea. It also operates hotels, restaurants, and drugstores across its service region. JR Kyushu's headquarters are in Hakata-ku, Fukuoka.

History
When Japanese National Railways was divided in 1987, Kyushu Railway Company inherited its assets and operations on the island of Kyushu along with losses of around 28.8 billion yen, exacerbated by a growing highway network in Kyushu and many lightly used rural lines. After privatization, JR Kyushu diversified its business into new ventures such as fish and mushroom farming and car sales. Two of its more successful side ventures were the Beetle ferry, started in 1991, and the Train d'or bakery chain, started in 1992. JR Kyushu also built up its premium rail services through the development of the Kyushu Shinkansen high-speed rail line and the Seven Stars in Kyushu luxury excursion train.

The company introduced SUGOCA, a smart card ticketing system, from 1 March 2009.

JR Kyushu executed its initial public offering in October 2016. Non-railway operations account for roughly 60% of the company's sales and most of its profits.

Lines

Shinkansen line
 Kyushu Shinkansen (Kagoshima Route)
 Nishi Kyushu Shinkansen

Main lines

 Kagoshima Main Line
 Nagasaki Main Line
 Kyūdai Main Line: Nicknamed Yufu Kōgen Line
 Hōhi Main Line: Nicknamed Aso Kōgen Line
 Nippō Main Line
 Chikuhō Main Line: Divided to three segments with different nicknames, namely Haruda Line, Fukuhoku Yutaka Line, and Wakamatsu Line.

Other lines
 Chikuhi Line
 Fukuhoku Yutaka Line: A nickname for the route formed by portions of Kagoshima Main Line, Chikuhō Main Line, and the whole part of Sasaguri Line.
 Gotōji Line
 Hisatsu Line
 Hitahikosan Line
 Ibusuki Makurazaki Line
 Kashii Line
 Karatsu Line
 Kitto Line
 Misumi Line
 Miyazaki Kūkō Line
 Nichinan Line
 Ōmura Line
 Sasaguri Line
 Sasebo Line

Limited express and tourist train services

 Ariake (Hakata - Kumamoto)
 Aru Ressha (Ōita - Hita April to June)(Sasebo - Nagasaki July to September)
 Aso Boy (Kumamoto - Miyaji)
 A-Train (Kumamoto - Misumi)
 Hayato no Kaze (Kagoshima-Chūō - Yoshimatsu)
 Huis Ten Bosch (Hakata - Huis Ten Bosch)
 Ibusuki no Tamatebako (Kagoshima-Chūō - Ibusuki)
 Isaburo & Shinpei (Hitoyoshi - Yoshimatsu)
 Kaiō (Hakata - Nōgata)
 Kasasagi (Hakata - Hizen-Kashima)
 Kawasemi Yamasemi (Kumamoto - Hitoyoshi)
 Kirameki (Mojikō - Hakata)
 Kirishima (Miyazaki - Kagoshima-Chūō)
 Kumagawa (Kumamoto - Hitoyoshi)
 Midori (Hakata - Sasebo)
 Nichirin/Nichirin Seagaia (Kokura - Miyazaki Kūkō)
 Relay Kamome (Hakata - Takeo-Onsen)
 Seven Stars in Kyushu (Circular tours of Kyushu)
 SL Hitoyoshi (Kumamoto - Hitoyoshi/Kumamoto - Tosu)
 Sonic (Hakata - Ōita)
 Trans-Kyushu Limited Express (Hitoyoshi - Ōita)
 Umisachi-Yamasachi (Miyazaki - Nangō)
 Yufu / Yufu DX/Yufuin-no-mori (Hakata - Ōita)

See also

 Kyūshū Railway - a predecessor of JR Kyushu

Notes

References

External links

 Homepage

 
Railway companies established in 1987
Companies based in Fukuoka Prefecture
Transport in Fukuoka